Orchinol is a 9,10-dihydrophenanthrene, a type of phenanthrenoid. It can be isolated from infected Orchis militaris and infected Loroglossum hircinum with Rhizoctonia repens. This molecule has a phytoalexin effect. It reduces the growth of Cattleya aurantiaca seedlings and has an antifungal activity.

References

External links 
 Orchinol at kanaya.naist.jp/knapsack_jsp
 Orchinol at WikiGenes

Phenanthrenoids